The A39 is an A road in south west England. It runs south-west from Bath in Somerset through Wells, Glastonbury, Street and Bridgwater. It then follows the north coast of Somerset, Devon and Cornwall through Williton, Minehead, Porlock, Lynmouth, Barnstaple, Bideford, Stratton, Camelford, Wadebridge and St Columb Major.

In Cornwall and North Devon (until the junction with the A361 "North Devon Link Road"), the road is known as the Atlantic Highway, and was classified as a trunk road until 2002.

Porlock Hill

Porlock Hill is a section of the A39 west of the village of Porlock.

In Porlock itself you will often smell burning brakes from vehicles who have just descended the hill.

On 12 January 1899, the ten-ton Lynmouth lifeboat was launched during a storm, but the storm's ferocity meant it could not put out to sea. Instead, it was retrieved and hauled by men and twenty horses over Countisbury and Porlock hills to Porlock Weir where the water in the bay was less rough. The endeavour eventually enabled thirteen seamen to be rescued.

There is a less steep toll road that small vehicles and cyclists can take as an alternative route. It formed part of the route in the 2007 Tour of Britain cycle race. Another alternative for cyclists, avoiding tolls, is provided by part of Regional Cycle Route 51 (Minehead to Ilfracombe).

Countisbury Hill
About  to the west of Porlock Hill, the A39 starts its equivalent descent from the hills of Exmoor. Unlike Porlock Hill, this section is relatively straight down into Lynmouth village where there is a bridge over the river and a sharp left turn, however the gradient at the foot is also 25% for a short distance. The original road between Lynmouth and Lynton was much more challenging with gradients of around 1 in 3 (33%). It is now the B3234, Lynmouth Hill.

Woody Bay

Woody Bay was once an intermediate stop on, and is now the main operating centre of, the Lynton & Barnstaple Railway a narrow-gauge line built in 1898, which closed in 1935. Over- and under-bridges and other traces of the line can be seen at various locations along this stretch of the road.

Atlantic Highway
Atlantic Highway is the name given to a section of the A39, as it passes from the North Devon Link Road at Barnstaple in Devon until it reaches the A30 at Fraddon in Cornwall.

It is so called, as it is the main road (it was a trunk road until 2002) from mid-Cornwall to North Devon and follows the line of the Atlantic Ocean's coast. It is also named thus due to the former Southern Railway express that ran in this part of North Devon and North Cornwall (the Atlantic Coast Express). Views of the Atlantic can be seen along its length, although the road does not approach very close to the coastline itself.

The road is signified as the Atlantic Highway by road signs indicating the route mileage throughout its length, in both directions, in white on brown above the green background of the route mileage boards.

It passes by Wadebridge, Bude and Bideford, and directly through Camelford.

Points of interest

See also

 L&B Railway Project

References

External links
SABRE page on the A39

Roads in Cornwall
Roads in Devon
Roads in England
Roads in Somerset
Scenic routes in the United Kingdom